This is a non-exhaustive list of Guatemala women's international footballers – association football players who have appeared at least once for the senior Guatemala women's national football team.

Players

See also 
 Guatemala women's national football team

References 

 
International footballers
Guatemala
Football in Guatemala
Association football player non-biographical articles
footballers